Klinga Church is a parish church of the Church of Norway in Namsos municipality in Trøndelag county, Norway. It is located in the village of Klinga. It is the church for the Klinga parish which is part of the Namdal prosti (deanery) in the Diocese of Nidaros. The white, wooden church was built in a long church style in 1866 using plans drawn up by the architects Ernst Kulaas and Jacob Wilhelm Nordan. The church seats about 270 people.

History
The earliest existing historical records of the church date back to the year 1563, but the church was likely built during the 14th century. Records from 1639 state that the church was very small and fragile, in need of supports for the exterior walls so they would not collapse in a storm. Shortly afterwards, around the year 1640, the choir was expanded. In 1705, the old church was torn down and replaced with a new, larger church on the same site. The new church was consecrated on 7 March 1866. After the new church was put into use, the old church at Sævik was torn down and sold to a private individual who used the materials to build a jetty and boathouse in Namsos. During World War II, the church tower was dismantled (or reduced in size) by the Germans, presumably so that the church would not be a landmark for Allied airplanes. A new tower was designed by Arne Sørvik and was completed in 1948.

Media gallery

See also
List of churches in Nidaros

References

Namsos
Churches in Trøndelag
Long churches in Norway
Wooden churches in Norway
19th-century Church of Norway church buildings
Churches completed in 1866
14th-century establishments in Norway